Zenophassus is a monotypic moth genus of the family Hepialidae. The only described species is Z. schamyl of Georgia and Abkhazia. The larva of this species feeds on grapevines.

It was named after Imam Shamil, the leader of a nineteenth century rebellion against the Russian annexation of the Caucasus.

References

External links 
 Hepialidae genera link not working

Hepialidae
Monotypic moth genera
Moths of Europe
Moths of Asia
Grape pest insects
Taxa named by Norman Tindale
Exoporia genera